The Girl in Tails may refer to:

 The Girl in Tails (1926 film), Swedish silent film
 The Girl in Tails (1956 film), Swedish film